Daniel Felipe Martínez Poveda (born 25 April 1996) is a Colombian professional road racing cyclist, who currently rides for UCI WorldTeam .

Career

Colombia (2015)
Martínez abandoned the Volta a Catalunya, his first World Tour race ever. He finished 84th in the Tour of Turkey.

Southeast–Venezuela (2016–2017)
He rode his first ever Grand Tour in 2016, starting at the Giro d'Italia. He also finished 57th at Il Lombardia. He started in the Giro d'Italia once again in 2017, but abandoned the race. At the end of the season, he finished 4th in the Presidential Tour of Turkey.

EF Education First–Drapac (2018–2020)
Martínez started the 2018 season at the Colombian National Road Championships, where he finished 2nd in the time trial, behind Egan Bernal. He went on to finish 5th in the new Colombian race, Colombia Oro y Paz. His first top 10 finish in Europe, was at the Volta a Catalunya, where he rode himself to 7th place overall. He rode the Belgian classics for the first time in his career, finishing 44th in La Fléche Wallonne and 61st in Liège–Bastogne–Liège. Then he rode the Tour de Romandie, and finished 12th. In July 2018, he was named in the start list for the Tour de France. In August 2019, he was named in the startlist for the Vuelta a España.

At the start of the 2020 season, and prior to the COVID-19 pandemic-enforced suspension of racing, Martínez won his second consecutive title at the Colombian National Time Trial Championships, and was second to teammate Sergio Higuita in the Tour Colombia, winning the final stage. Martínez won the Critérium du Dauphiné in August, moving from fifth to first on the final day with a second-place stage finish to Sepp Kuss. At the Tour de France, he claimed his first Grand Tour stage win from a breakaway on stage 13, which finished at Puy Mary. He finished the race 28th overall, his best Grand Tour overall placing to that point.

Ineos Grenadiers (2021–present)
Martínez joined the  team on an initial one-year contract for the 2021 season. During the Giro d'Italia, Martínez was a mountain domestique for his compatriot of countryman Egan Bernal, who ultimately won the race. Martínez moved his way up the general classification throughout the race, and moved up from seventh to fifth overall on the final weekend; he finished third on the final mountain stage that finished at the Alpe Motta in the Valle Spluga, driving the pace for Bernal while minimising any potential time loss to Damiano Caruso, who won the stage. He finished third in the young rider classification, behind Bernal and Aleksandr Vlasov.

To begin the 2022 season he won a record-equalling third Colombian National Time Trial Championships, and finished in third place overall at both the Volta ao Algarve and Paris–Nice. His next stage race was the Tour of the Basque Country, where he won the fourth stage and ultimately the race overall, after Remco Evenepoel was distanced on the final climb. At both the Tour de Suisse and the Tour de France, Martínez was part of an  team that included Adam Yates, Geraint Thomas and Tom Pidcock. At the latter, Martínez moved into the top-ten overall after the sixth stage, but his general classification hopes were ended after he lost almost half an hour on the two stages either side of the first rest day, which was attributed to illness. He grew stronger by the end of the race and was joined with Wout van Aert and Thibaut Pinot as the final breakaway riders on Hautacam. Eventually Pinot fell back, and the pair rode on alone but ultimately finished behind the GC contenders. Martínez continued riding hard because Geraint Thomas was approaching, who finished 4th on the stage to secure the final podium position.

Major results

2013
 Pan American Junior Road Championships
1st  Time trial
2nd  Road race
2014
 1st  Time trial, National Junior Road Championships
2015
 1st  Mountains classification, Route du Sud
 8th Overall Tour of Utah
1st  Young rider classification
2017
 4th Overall Tour of Turkey
1st  Young rider classification
 7th Milano–Torino
 9th Tre Valli Varesine
2018
 2nd Time trial, National Road Championships
 3rd Overall Tour of California
 5th Overall Colombia Oro y Paz
 6th Overall Colorado Classic
1st  Young rider classification
 7th Overall Volta a Catalunya
2019
 1st  Time trial, Pan American Games
 1st  Time trial, National Road Championships
 1st Stage 7 Paris–Nice
 2nd Overall Tour of Guangxi
 3rd Overall Tour Colombia
1st Stage 1 (TTT)
2020
 National Road Championships
1st  Time trial
3rd Road race
 1st  Overall Critérium du Dauphiné
1st  Young rider classification
 1st Stage 13 Tour de France
 2nd Overall Tour Colombia
1st Stages 1 (TTT) & 6
2021
 5th Overall Giro d'Italia
2022
 1st  Time trial, National Road Championships
 1st  Overall Tour of the Basque Country
1st  Points classification
1st Stage 4
 1st Coppa Sabatini
 3rd Overall Paris–Nice
 3rd Overall Volta ao Algarve
 3rd Giro della Toscana
 4th Liège–Bastogne–Liège
 5th La Flèche Wallonne
 8th Overall Tour de Suisse
2023
 1st  Overall Volta ao Algarve
 National Road Championships
2nd Road race
5th Time trial

General classification results timeline

References

External links
 
 
 
 
 

1996 births
Living people
Colombian male cyclists
Colombian Tour de France stage winners
Pan American Games medalists in cycling
Pan American Games gold medalists for Colombia
Cyclists at the 2019 Pan American Games
Medalists at the 2019 Pan American Games
People from Cundinamarca Department
21st-century Colombian people